A penumbral lunar eclipse took place on Monday, October 27, 1958.

Visibility

Related lunar eclipses

Lunar year series

Half-Saros cycle
A lunar eclipse will be preceded and followed by solar eclipses by 9 years and 5.5 days (a half saros). This lunar eclipse is related to two solar eclipses of Solar Saros 152.

See also
List of lunar eclipses
List of 20th-century lunar eclipses

Notes

External links

1958-10
1958 in science